View of Venice, also known as the de' Barbari Map, is a monumental woodcut print showing a bird's-eye view of the city of Venice from the southwest. It bears the title and date "VENETIE MD" ("Venice 1500"). The individual sheets of paper were the largest produced in Europe up to that time.

The finished work has an approximate scale of 1:1,250 (east-west) and 1:2,750 (north-south) and was probably intended for display on a wall. Examples of the three states of the print are held by public collections.  The six large wooden printing blocks would have been carved by professional cutters, following preparatory drawings made by Jacopo de' Barbari.  The six original blocks, probably made from walnut, now with splits and damage from woodworm, are in the Museo Correr in Venice.  

The print is one of the first large bird's-eye cityscape views, and may have been inspired by views of Florence by Francesco Rosselli from the 1480s.  It may be the earliest surviving comprehensive view of Venice: earlier views by Leon Battista Alberti and Jacopo Bellini are believed to be lost. The British Library quotes an article by art historian Martin Kemp in 1991 in which he says it is "an achievement of astonishing visual and intellectual control".

Description
The print shows Venice and the surrounding islands in the Venetian lagoon, including Burano, Giudecca, Mazzorbo, Murano, and Torcello. The Alps to the north line the horizon along the top edge. The names of some locations and buildings are printed. The print shows the location of Venetian churches and other buildings, including 103 bell towers. 

The city is depicted in a realistic form, like a topographical landscape view, with large or important buildings generally depicted on the same scale as smaller or less important ones. The buildings and street plan are simplified in some areas, and the heights of many buildings are exaggerated, to make towers taller than they should be in proportion to their length or width: so for example the Doge's Palace is depicted about 50% taller than compared to its width.

The apparent accuracy of the print has led some commentators to suggest that it may be based on a ground survey, perhaps with observations from the city's bell towers, but the analysis of Juergen Schulz in 1978 suggests this is not entirely correct. Rather, according to Schulz, de' Barbari seems to have started his drawing on the right side (east), perhaps based on plans used for maintenance of the city's waterways, and progressively compressed and distorted the scale as he ran out of space moving towards the left (west) edge. However Deborah Howard has suggested as the production of the work had taken three years and had been so expensive that the distortion was not an accident, and that the layout of the city in the woodcut was deliberately distorted for the iconographic purpose of making the shape of Venice resemble a dolphin, with its rounded head to the left and tail to the right. Howard notes the continued dolphin-like representation of the city's outline in maps made as late as the 19th century, echoing de' Barbari's print.

Winds and deities

Around the edge are eight personifications of winds, two on each side, labelled with the names of the twelve classical compass winds or Anemoi: clockwise from the top, Septentrio (T), Aquilo and Fulturnus (G), Subsolanus (cross), Eurus and Eurauster (S), Auster (O), Auster Affricus and Affricus (A), Favonius (P), Corus and Circius (M). The letters refer to the traditional labels of the compass rose: Tramontana to the north, Greco to the northeast, Levante to the east, Sirocco to the southeast, Ostro to the south, Affricus to the southwest, Ponente to the west, and Maestro (Mistral) to the northwest. The positions of each wind are more determined more by artistic considerations than the true orientation of the city in the image.

At the top of the print is a depiction of Mercury, the Roman god of commerce, with the inscription "MERCVRIVS PRECETERIS HVIC FAVSTE EMPORIIS ILLVSTRO"  (Latin: "I Mercury shine favourably on this above all other emporia". Neptune, Roman god of the seas, with a trident, rides a dolphin in the harbour, accompanied by an inscription reading "AEQVORA TVENS PORTV RESIDEO HIC NEPTVNVS" (Latin: "I Neptune reside here smoothing the harbour waters"). The Latin title, "VENETI[A]E" is given in the locative case, specifically locating the image with the gods "At Venice" or "In Venice". The two gods are slightly offset from the centre of the composite print to lie either side of and emphasise the important area from the Rialto to the Piazza San Marco.

Authorship and Publication
On 30 October 1500, the Signoria of Venice gave the publisher Anton Kolb an exemption from duties on the export of the print, and also the exclusive right to reproduce the print for the next four years. The publication of the print in October 1500 was independently mentioned in the contemporaneous diary of the Venetian writer Marino Sanuto the Younger. 

In his application to the Signoria, Kolb had stated that the print took three years to prepare, but he did not name the artist. Because of its high quality the print was traditionally attributed to Albrecht Dürer, but that attribution was doubted from the 18th century. Today it is confidently attributed to the Venetian painter and printmaker Jacopo de' Barbari, whose details recall German masters. He marks his works with the caduceus, in this case carried by the figure of Mercury at the top. Until his paintings were identified, his works were attributed to the notname "Master of the Caduceus". The windgods resemble the faces of his engravings. The attribution relies on stylistic and technical resemblances further as well as on the documented association with Kolb after the publication. Between 1500 and 1504 they were employed by Maximilian I, Holy Roman Emperor.

Jacopos print is an accomplished High Renaissance work with detailed components compared to Rosselli's Florence print.

Prints
To recoup the costs the prints had to be sold at least for three ducats, a considerable sum, similar to the monthly wage of a master painter. Examples soon entered the collections of wealthy collectors from church and state, who may have sufficient wall space to display the assembled composite print as intended, pasted on a linen support or directly onto the wall.

Three states of the print are known, with the second state in two variants. Around a dozen (different sources say 11, 12 or 13) impressions of the first state of the woodcut are known, and a similar number of the other two states.  The unusually large number of surviving prints suggests that the work was treated as a valuable work of art, rather than a working topographical image.  The first state published in 1500 shows St Mark's Campanile with a temporary flat roof after it was struck by lightning and caught fire in 1489.  The second state was published c. 1514; it was altered to show the Campanile as restored in 1511–4 after it was damaged by an earthquake in 1511, and the original date (MD - 1500) was removed: one variant leaves a blank space where the date was in the first state, and another fills the space with horizontal hatching.  The third state was published later in the 16th century, adding back the date (MD), and with the Campanile altered again to show a much cruder version of the flat-roofed depiction in the first state (but forgetting to remove the angel-shaped weather vane added on top of the tower in the adjacent sheet).

Locations
Examples of the first state are held by several public collections.   listed the locations of known prints in 1964, and several more have come to light since then.

Bibliography

Notes

References

 British Museum
 Bird's eye view of Venice from the south, British Museum (first state)
 Bird's eye view of Venice from the south, British Museum (second state)

Museo Correr
 Ambito veneziano - Pianta prospettica della città di Venezia - Legno di pero inciso (Woodblocks), Museo Correr
 Venezia (Ve) - Xilografia in sei blocchi su carta (print), Museo Correr

 Google Arts & Culture
 View of Venice [upper left block], at National Gallery of Art, Washington DC, Google Arts & Culture (second state)
 View of Venice, at Minneapolis Institute of Art, Google Arts & Culture (first state)
 Veduta prospettica di Venezia, Museo Correr, Google Arts & Culture (first state)

 View of Venice, 1500, Minneapolis Institute of Art (first state)
 View of Venice, Cleveland Museum of Art (first state)

 Jacopo de Barbari Zugschrieben: Ansicht von Venedig (print), Germanisches National Museum, Nuremberg (first state)
 Vue de Venise à vol d'oiseau (print), Bibliothèque nationale de France (first state)
 Jacopo De Barbari, Pianta Prospettica di Venezia (Perspective Map of Venice), Fondazione Querini Stampalia (first state)

 Vedere dall'alto. La veduta di Venezia di Jacopo de' Barbari (1500), Marciana Library (second state)

 A Portrait of Venice: Jacopo de’Barbari’s View of 1500, Duke University
 A Portrait of Venice: Jacopo de’ Barbari’s View of 1500 , Nasher Museum of Art, Duke University

 Mapping Venice 1500: Searching the de’ Barbari Map — Final Report, The Venice Atlas
 "Renaissance man: why Jacopo de' Barbari is the artist of the moment", The Guardian, 14 May 2000

External links
 Museum of Fine Arts, Boston (first state): 1 • 2 • 3 • 4 • 5 • 6
 National Gallery of Art, Washington DC (second state): upper left block • upper center block • upper right block  • lower left block • lower center block • lower right block
 Albertina (state IIA): 1 • 2 • 3 • 4 • 5 • 6 • 7 • 8 • 9 • 10 • 11 • 12
 Albertina (state III):  1 • 2 • 3  • 4 • 5  • 6
 gigapans
Woodcuts
16th-century prints
Renaissance prints
Venice in art